Kefermarkt is a municipality in the district of Freistadt in the Austrian state of Upper Austria. The church in Kefermarkt houses the late medieval Kefermarkt Altarpiece.

Population

Gallery

References

Cities and towns in Freistadt District